The RAF 3 was a British liquid-cooled, V-12 engine developed for aircraft use during World War I. Based on the eight–cylinder RAF 1 it was designed by the Royal Aircraft Factory but produced by the two British companies of Armstrong Whitworth and Napier & Son. The RAF 7 was a high compression version of the same engine.

Variants
RAF 3
1914 - Prototype engine, 200 horsepower (150 kW).
RAF 3a
1914 - Main production variant, increased bore, 260 horsepower (194 kW).  29 built by Armstrong Whitworth, 260 built by Napier & Son.
RAF 7
300 horsepower (224 kW) high compression version with high-lift camshafts.

Applications
Airco DH.4
Royal Aircraft Factory R.E.7

Specifications (RAF 3a)

See also

References

Notes

Bibliography

 Gunston, Bill. World Encyclopaedia of Aero Engines. Cambridge, England. Patrick Stephens Limited, 1989. 
 Lumsden, Alec. British Piston Engines and their Aircraft. Marlborough, Wiltshire: Airlife Publishing, 2003. .

1910s aircraft piston engines